Chimei may refer to:
 Chimei Corporation - a Taiwan-based performance materials company; formerly Chi Mei Corporation
 Chimei Museum - a museum in Tainan, Taiwan
 Chimei Philharmonic Orchestra - a Taiwanese symphony orchestra
  Chimei（魑魅） - a supernatural being in Chinese folklore
 Red Eyebrows - a peasant rebellion in the Xin dynasty